Bazenheid is a village in the municipality of Kirchberg, located in the canton of St. Gallen.

As of 2013, a population of 3560 lives there and it contains approximately 30% foreigners.

It was first mentioned in 779 as Pacinuueidu.

Football team FC Bazenheid play there.

References

External links 
 Official website

Villages in Switzerland